Rich and Poor is an Iranian Drama and Comedy series. The series is directed by Masoud Dehnamaki.This series has been broadcast simultaneously on two channels, IRIB TV5 and Jame Jam.

Storyline 
Teymour Golchin is an old man, selfish and wealthy man who has sold all his property, invested in construction in Dubai and is going there forever. In Dubai, Teymour unexpectedly faces the effects of the global economic crisis and realizes that his Iranian partner has fled and…

Cast 
 Fathali Oveisi
 Sam Derakhshani
 Reza Rooygari
 Alireza Khamseh
 Negar Foroozandeh
 Marjaneh Golchin
 Behnoosh Bakhtiari
 Javad Hashemi
 Maryam Kavyani
 Shohreh Lorestani
 Nafiseh Roshan
 Maryam Soltani
 Sahar Valadbeigi
 Reza Tavakoli
 Yousef Sayadi
 Shahrzad Kamalzadeh
 Shahab Abbasi
 Reza Banafshekhah
 Yousef Teymouri
 Fatemeh Taheri
 Ramin Rastad
 Alireza Oveisi
 Abbas Mahboub
 Farhad Besharati
 Fariba Torkashovand
 Malakeh Ranjbar
 Saghi Zinati
 Behzad Rahimkhani
 Majid Shahriari
 Shahrbanoo Mousavi
 Ebrahim Bahralolomi

References

External links
 

2010s Iranian television series
Iranian television series